Lake Saint Pierre is a lake in Quebec, Canada, a widening of the Saint Lawrence River between Sorel-Tracy and Trois-Rivières. It is located downstream, and northeast, of Montreal; and upstream, and southwest, of Quebec City. The end of the lake delimits the beginning of the estuary of Saint Lawrence.

Including its shoreline, islands, and wetlands, the lake is a nature reserve. The body of water is recognized as a Ramsar site and as a Biosphere Reserve, due to the presence of many marshes and wetlands that are frequented by waterfowl. Recreational activities on the river (such as fishing, boating, sailing, swimming, water skiing, nature observation) are active mainly in summer season. Sport fishing is particularly popular, including ice fishing, especially in the great bay of Pointe-du-Lac.

Around Lake Saint-Pierre, several recreational services are available including marinas, hotel services, restaurants, outfitters, docks, gas stations, and cruises.

Geography 
Approximately 12,500 years ago, the retreat of the glaciers at the end of the last ice age resulted in a vast basin filled by the Champlain Sea. This sea extended from the city of Quebec to the east, and covered the Lower Mauricie, the Lower Laurentians, the lower part of the Ottawa Valley, Lake Ontario on the western side, and Lake Champlain USA) on the South side. The outline of the Champlain Sea is marked by ancient sandy shores where sand pits have been exploited. The water level has dropped some 8,000 years ago. Lake Saint-Pierre is linked to 11 administrative regions, 58 RCMs and 654 municipalities.

The lake is located in the Regional County Municipalities of Nicolet-Yamaska, Maskinongé, D'Autray, and Pierre-De Saurel, in addition to the city of Trois-Rivières. The shores of the lake affect several municipalities: 
 North shore: Berthierville, Maskinongé, Louiseville, Yamachiche and Trois-Rivières (Pointe-du-Lac sector)
 South shore: Saint-Joseph-de-Sorel, Pierreville, Baie-du-Febvre and Nicolet.

Lake Saint-Pierre is fed by the St. Lawrence River (coming from the southwest) and the 14 main tributaries:
 North bank (from the mouth): Maskinongé River, Rivière du Loup, Yamachiche River, Glaises Stream, Sable River
 South bank (from the mouth): Yamaska River, Saint-François River, Colbert River, Landroche River, Des Frères River, Brielle River, Lemire River, Camille-Roy River, Nicolet River

The average depth of the lake is only three meters. The channel of the seaway that has been dredged has a maximum depth of 11.3 m.

Toponymy 
The lake was named by Samuel de Champlain following its passage on 29 June 1603, the day of the Saint-Pierre. The Abenaki call Lake Nebesek, which means at lac. Jacques Cartier, during his second voyage to Canada in 1535, had given him the name of "Angoulême".

Natural environment 
This seasonally-flooded area is an important stopping point for hundreds of thousands of migrating waterfowl. It is also an important nesting area for herons: more have been counted here than in any other place in North America. In 1998, it was recognized as a wetland of international significance under the Ramsar Convention.

The wildlife experts have identified 23 species of mammals around Lake Saint-Pierre, one of the most abundant species is the muskrat (Ondatra zibethicus), which is found in abundance in the lake.

Biosphere Reserve 
Lake Saint-Pierre was appointed Biosphere Reserve by UNESCO in 2000. The core areas are composed of Wildlife Refuge Great Island and bird refuge Nicolet.

Nearly 290 species of birds, about 90 species of fish and 27 rare plants have been listed in this biosphere reserve.

Wildlife Sanctuary of Great Island 
 
Wildlife Sanctuary of "Grande-Île" (Great Island) is located on Grande-île in the Archipelago of Saint-Pierre Lake. This wildlife refuge was created in 1992 is the protection of one of the largest heron colonies in North America. It houses more than 5,000 herons.

Nicolet Bird Sanctuary 
 
National Defence has acquired the site in the 1950. The site was recognized as a rest area in 1969 and as a refuge in 1982.

History 

Being the last freshwater basin of the St. Lawrence River and its geographical position, Lake Saint-Pierre has marked the history of French Canada in terms of the fishing industry, hunting, transportation including the St. Lawrence Seaway, pleasure boating, the settlement of surrounding lands, winter ice roads and ferries.

Samuel de Champlain wrote, in 1609: "On the south side, there are two rivers, one called the" Rivière du Pont (Nicolet) and the other of Gennes (Saint-François or Yamaska), which are very beautiful and in beautiful and good country. "

Environment

Disasters and tragedies

In popular culture 
 Lac Saint-Pierre is the setting of the poem, folk ballad, and animated short, "the Wreck of the Julie Plante", by William Henry Drummond.
 It is not the lake sought after by Duddy Kravitz in The Apprenticeship of Duddy Kravitz by Mordecai Richler. The lake in this book is clearly in walking distance of Lac des Sables.

See also 
 Saint Lawrence Lowlands
 Archipelago of Saint-Pierre Lake

References

External links

 
Lac Saint Pierre Biosphere Reserve, Canada (UNESCO site)

Biosphere reserves of Canada
Saint-Pierre
Ramsar sites in Canada
Nature reserves in Quebec
Saint Lawrence River
Saint-Pierre
Saint-Pierre
Geological type localities